The 23rd Street station is a local station on the IND Eighth Avenue Line of the New York City Subway, located at the intersection of 23rd Street and Eighth Avenue in Chelsea, Manhattan. It is served by the C and E trains, the former of which is replaced by the A train during late nights.

Station layout

This underground station opened on September 10, 1932, as part of the city-operated Independent Subway System (IND)'s initial segment, the Eighth Avenue Line between Chambers Street and 207th Street. There are four tracks and two side platforms. The two center tracks are used by the A express train during daytime hours. Just north of this station, a storage track begins between the two express tracks. This track runs north and stub-ends at the south end of the center platform at 34th Street–Penn Station.

There is no trim line in this station, but both platform walls have mosaic name tablets reading "23RD ST." in white sans-serif lettering on a yellow background and same yellow border. Small "23" tile captions in white numbering on a black background run along the walls, and directional signs in the same format are present below some of the name tablets. Yellow I-beam columns run along the platforms at regular intervals, alternating ones having the standard black station name plate with white lettering.

The station was planned to be renovated as part of the 2010–2014 MTA Capital Program. An MTA study conducted in 2014 found that 40% of station components were out of date. In 2015–2016, two of the staircases were renovated. The MTA undertook design studies in the 2015–2019 MTA Capital Program, but deferred actual construction.

Exits
All fare controls are on platform level. The full-time ones are at the south end of the station, at 23rd Street. Each entrance and exit has a turnstile bank, token booth, and two staircases to the street. The northbound side leads to either eastern corner of 23rd Street and Eighth Avenue and the southbound side leads to either western corner. A crossunder within fare control at the 23rd Street end connects both platforms.

Each platform has an exit-only at the center, at 24th Street. Two High Entry-Exit Turnstiles lead to a small mezzanine, where a single staircase goes up to the streets. The northbound side leads to the southeast corner of 24th Street and 8th Avenue, and the southbound side to the northwest corner.

Both platforms have another fare control area at their north ends, at 25th Street, that require going up a short flight of stairs to reach. Though open at all times, they are unstaffed, containing HEET turnstiles without a token booth. Each entrance here has two street stairs, the northbound side to either eastern corner of 25th Street and Eighth Avenue and the southbound side to either western corner. The crossunder here is closed.

References

External links 

 
 Station Reporter — C Train
 Station Reporter — E Train
 23rd Street Entrance from Google Maps Street View
 24th Street Exit Only Stairs from Google Maps Street View
 25th Street Entrance from Google Maps Street View
 Platforms from Google Maps Street View

IND Eighth Avenue Line stations
Eighth Avenue (Manhattan)
New York City Subway stations in Manhattan
Railway stations in the United States opened in 1932
Chelsea, Manhattan
23rd Street (Manhattan)